The Abbey Christian School was a school set up to teach English as a foreign language to prospective Christian missionaries. It was based in the extensive premises of Abbey Road Baptist Church in London, England and ran for forty years, from 1962 to 2002.

The school was set up by Pastor LR Barnard of Abbey Road Baptist Church. From small beginnings it grew until it was taking in 60 to 70 students each term from countries all around the world. It closed on 14 June 2002.

External links 
 Abbey Road baptist Church

Christian schools in England
Defunct schools in the City of Westminster
Educational institutions established in 1962
1962 establishments in England
Educational institutions disestablished in 2002
2002 disestablishments in England